Priyanka Arul Mohan also known as Priyanka Mohan (born 20 November 1994) is an Indian actress who primarily appears in Tamil and Telugu films. She made her acting debut with 2019 Kannada film Ondh Kathe Hella, and Telugu debut with Nani's Gang Leader (2019), and in Tamil with Doctor (2021).

She has appeared in successful films such as Nani's Gang Leader (2019), Doctor (2021), Etharkkum Thunindhavan (2022) and Don (2022). She Has Won One SIIMA Award and one JFW Movie Award for Best Debutante

Early life
Priyanka Arul Mohan was born to a Tamil father and a Kannadiga mother.

Career
Priyanka made her debut in the Kannada film Ondh Kathe Hella in 2019. Later that year, she starred in the Telugu film Nani's Gang Leader. She also shot for the English version of the bilingual film Mayan; however, the film was delayed.

In 2021, she made her Tamil debut with Sivakarthikeyan's  Doctor, directed by Nelson Dilipkumar. She played the lead female role in her second Tamil film Etharkkum Thunindhavan with director Pandiraj, starring Suriya. The film opened up to mixed reviews but her potrayal was praised. She also played the lead in the Tamil film Don, with Sivakarthikeyan after Doctor. Now she is working alongside Dhanush in the upcoming film Captain Miller  and an untitled M. Rajesh film alongside Jayam Ravi marking their first collaboration.

Filmography

References

External links 
 
 

Living people
Actresses in Kannada cinema
Indian film actresses
21st-century Indian actresses
1994 births
Actresses in Telugu cinema
Actresses in Tamil cinema
Actresses from Tamil Nadu
Kannada actresses
Kannada people
Tamil actresses